Events from the year 1717 in France

Incumbents
 Monarch – Louis XV
Regent: Philip II of Orleans

Events
4 January (24 December 1716 OS) – Triple Alliance treaty between France, the Dutch Republic and Great Britain against Spain

Arts and culture
27 March – Actress Adrienne Lecouvreur is invited to join the Comédie-Française in Paris, performing first in the title rôle of Prosper Jolyot de Crébillon's Electre
16 May – Voltaire is sentenced to eleven months in the Bastille and banished from Paris for criticizing the Duc D'Orléans; while in prison he writes his first play, Oedipe ("Oedipus")
The last two volumes of Antoine Galland's Les mille et une nuits are published posthumously in Lyon of the first translation of One Thousand and One Nights into a European language, including the first translation of the story of Ali Baba

Births
18 January – Jean-François-Marie de Surville, trader and navigator (died 1770)
8 May – Charles Guillaume Le Normant d'Étiolles, official, husband of Madame de Pompadour (died 1799)
20 June – Jacques Saly, sculptor (died 1776)
27 June – Louis Guillaume Lemonnier, botanist (died 1799)
13 August – Louis François, Prince of Conti, nobleman, military leader (died 1776)
15 August – Louis Carrogis Carmontelle, dramatist (died 1806)
5 October – Marie-Anne de Mailly-Nesle duchess de Châteauroux, mistress of King Louis XV of France (died 1744)
16 November – Jean le Rond d'Alembert, mathematician and encyclopædist (died 1783)
29 December – Charles Gravier, comte de Vergennes, statesman and diplomat (died 1785)
full date unknown – Claude Humbert Piarron de Chamousset, philanthropist (died 1773)

Deaths

3 March – Pierre Allix, Protestant clergyman (born 1641)
5 March – François de Callières, diplomat, member of the Académie française (born 1645)
3 April – Jacques Ozanam, mathematician (born 1640)
5 April – Jean Jouvenet, painter (born 1644)
8 April – Antoine Benoist, painter and sculptor (born 1632)
17 May – Bon Boullogne, painter (born 1649)
9 June – Jeanne Guyon, mystic (born 1648)
11 June – Louis de Carrières, priest and Bible commentator (born 1662)
29 June – Augustin le Gardeur de Courtemanche, soldier and ambassador (born 1663)
13 August – Nicolas Perrot, explorer, fur trader and diplomat (born c.1644)
September – Casimir Oudin, monk and librarian (born 1638)
October – Philippe Pastour de Costebelle, naval officer and Governor of Newfoundland (born 1661)
21 November – Jean-Baptiste Santerre, painter (born 1658)

See also

References

1710s in France